The International Bhojpuri Film Award (also known as the IBFA Awards) are a set of awards presented annually by Yashi Films International to honour the artistic and technical excellence of professionals in the Bhojpuri film industry. Instituted in 2015, the ceremony is held in different countries around the world every year. The first year of the International Bhojpuri Film Award was commenced in 2015 at Mauritius followed by IBFA 2016 Dubai, IBFA 2017 London, IBFA 2018 Malaysia and IBFA 2019 Singapore.

IBFA 2018 Awards the awards will be given for following categories: Best Film, Best Director, Best Actor, Best Actress, Best Supporting Actress, Best Actor in a Negative Role, Best Actor in A comic role, and Best Debut.

IBFA

IBFA Awards 2017

The third international Bhojpuri Film Awards were held in London on 16 July 2017. The actors who won in 2017 are:

Best Act
Best Actress - Madhu Sharma
Best Film - Aashik Awara
Star of the Millennium - Manoj Tiwari
Best Actor Critics' Choice - Ravi Kishan
Best Male Singer - Pawan Singh
Best Actress Viewers' Choice - Anjana Singh
Best director - Aslam Sheikh
Abhay Sinha - Best Producer
Kanu Mukherjee - Best Dance Director
Seema Singh - Dancing Queen
Arvind Akela Kallu - Best Romantic Actor
Yash Kumar - Best Action Actor
Nidhi Jha - Most Popular Actress
Anara Gupta - Purvanchal Film Award
Mohini Ghosh - Most Beautiful Actress
Kajal Yadav - Kalaashree Samman
Mani Bhattacharya - Best Female Debut
Shreya Mukherjee - Kalaashree Samman
Nisha Pandey - Sushree Samman
Sonu Pritam - Kalashree Samman
Vikas Singh Birappan - Kalaashree Samman
Bharat Sharma Vyas - Bhojpuri Lokgeet Samrat
Gopal Rai - Mahendra Mishir Samman
Kunal Singh - Bhojpuri Mahanayak Samman
Rakesh Shrivastav - Bhojpuri Lok Ratna
Rahul Srivastava - Comedy King
Ras Bihari Giri - Purvanchal Shree Samman
Uday Bhagat - Best PRO

IBFA Awards 2018
International Bhojpuri Film Awards 2018: Superstars From Malaysia

Best Actor - Dinesh Lal Yadav For Nirahua Hindustani 2
Most Popular Actor Award - Pawan Singh
Best Actress- Anjana Singh
Bhojpuri Dream Girl Award - Shubhi Sharma
Dancing Queen Award - Sambhavna Seth
Bhojpuri Personality Award - Avinash Dwivedi
Incredible India International Bhojpuri Legend Award - Manoj Tiwari
Best Actress Award (critics) - Amrapali Dubey
YouTube Queen - Amrapali Dubey
Nazir Hussain Award - Ravi Kishan
Best Actor Negative Role  - Sanjay Pandey
Best Actor in a Comic Role - Manoj Tiger
Most Versatile Actor - Vinay Anand
Supporting Actor Award - Awadhesh Mishra
Abhay Sinha — Best Producer

IBFA Awards 2019
 Best Film – Border
 Best Director – Aslam Sheikh (Maa Tujhe Salaam)
 Best Actor in a Leading Role (Male) – Pawan Singh for Maa Tujhe Sallam
 Best Actor in a Leading Role (Female) – Kajal Raghwani for (Sangharsh)
 Best Actor in a Negative Role – Ashok Samarth for Balam Ji I Love You
 Best Actor in a Comic Role – Manoj Tiger for Halfa Macha Ke Gail 
 Best Actor in a Supporting Role (Male) – Awdhesh Mishra for Sangharsh
 Best Actor in a Supporting Role (Female) – Shubhi Sharma for Nirahua Hindustani 3
 Best Singer (Male) – Pawan Singh for song Bhagwan Badi Fursat Se from Maa Tujhe Sallam
 Best Singer (Female) – Priyanka Singh for Maa Tujhe Sallam
 Best Music Director – Rajnish Mishra for song Cooler Kurti Main lga la ki cooling kart rhi from Deewanapan

History
The first international award ceremony took place in Mauritius. The second edition was held in Dubai, followed by the third edition in London.

See also
 Bhojpuri cinema
 List of Bhojpuri films
 Cinema of Bihar

References

External links
 

Bhojpuri cinema
Cinema of Bihar
Awards established in 2015
Indian film awards
2015 establishments in Bihar
Bihar awards